Muayad Aref Al Khouli (born 16 October 1993 in Syria) is a Syrian footballer. He currently plays for Tishreen, which competes in the Syrian Premier League, the top division in Syria.

References

1993 births
Living people
Syrian footballers
Syria international footballers
Association football defenders
Syrian expatriates in Iraq
Expatriate footballers in Iraq
Sportspeople from Damascus
Syrian Premier League players